The OAW C.II was a German reconnaissance aircraft prototype of World War I.

Design
The OAW C.II was built at the Albatros Schneidemühl factory, as a derivative of the OAW C.I, with a Mercedes D.IV eight-cylinder in-line engine. It had provisions for two crew, a pilot and an observer.

References

C.02
1910s German military reconnaissance aircraft
Single-engined tractor aircraft
Aircraft first flown in 1916